Green municipalism is a form of municipalism in which environmental change is seen from arising with action in the municipality, rather than on a state or national basis.

It has been discussed by Brian Milani in his book, Designing the Green Economy (2000). and by the Syracuse / Onondaga County Green Party Chapter at the US National Green Gathering of August 1992.

See also
 Libertarian municipalism
 Green libertarianism

References

External links
 Green Municipalism, by Ulli Diemer
 The Green City of the New Generation , by Beata Maciejewska and Dariusz Szwed

Green politics